Thomas Jefferson Jackson (T. J. J.) See (February 19, 1866 – July 4, 1962) was an American astronomer whose promulgated theories in astronomy and physics were eventually disproven. His educational and professional career were dogged by plagiarism and conflict, including his attacks on relativity. He was fired from his position at two observatories, eventually serving out his professional years at a naval shipyard in California.

Early life
See was born near Montgomery City, Missouri. He attended the University of Missouri, graduating in 1889 with an undergraduate career that was outwardly stellar. See achieved honors distinction in nearly every subject, became his class valedictorian and was the recipient of the Laws Astronomical Medal for an original thesis on an astronomical subject. However, his speech "The Spirit of the Age" was a plagiarized version of an earlier speech given by another student, and his "original thesis" for the Laws Astronomical Medal was claimed to be original work but was just from prior work by Sir George Darwin. See was also a critical player in the academic insurgency aimed at ousting university president Samuel Laws (in favor of See's mentor William Benjamin Smith). This plagiarism and bitter in-fighting "set the scene for a career perhaps unrivalled as an example of wasted talent". Nevertheless, with the outwardly strong credentials, See went to the University of Berlin where he received a PhD in mathematics in 1892. With a European doctorate, See returned to America with enviable credentials and a career of great promise.

Scientific work
See specialized in the study of binary stars, particularly in determining their orbits. See initially found work at the University of Chicago, where he worked as an instructor under George Ellery Hale. See left Chicago in 1896 after failing to receive a promotion. He next worked at Lowell Observatory until he was fired in 1898 for his arrogant attitude towards the staff. See's arrogance and overconfidence caused problems throughout his career, in both professional relationships and erroneous scientific results arising from carelessness. After his dismissal from Lowell, See joined the staff of the United States Naval Observatory in 1898.

It was at the Naval Observatory that some of See's previous work, and his arrogance, led to his downfall. Several years earlier, in 1895, while studying the well known binary star 70 Ophiuchi at the University of Chicago (and from a few observations made at the Leander McCormick Observatory of the University of Virginia during a visit in April 1895), See believed he had found small anomalies in the motion of one of the stars suggesting a third object was present and its gravitational influence was affecting the motion of the star (William Stephen Jacob had mentioned this possibility in an earlier study in 1855).  See's results were published in the Astronomical Journal. In 1899, Forest R. Moulton analyzed this proposed triple system and demonstrated convincingly that it would be unstable, and therefore very unlikely to actually exist (Moulton also pointed out that an orbit not requiring an unseen companion had been put forth by Eric Doolittle).  See took great offense and wrote an abusive letter to the Astronomical Journal. An edited version was published and he was banned from future publication in the Astronomical Journal.  See found himself increasingly at odds with other astronomers, and eventually suffered a breakdown in 1902. He spent one semester teaching at the United States Naval Academy, but was then transferred to a naval shipyard at Mare Island, California in charge of the time station, until his retirement in 1930.

In 1910 he published a 700+ page work entitled Researches on the Evolution of the Stellar Systems, Vol. II, The Capture Theory of Cosmical Evolution. In this work he describes his task to "brush aside the erroneous doctrines heretofore current, as one would the accumulated dust and cobwebs of ages".

In 1913 William Larkin Webb published a Brief Biography and Popular Account of the Unparalleled Discoveries of T. J. J. See. Webb was a newspaper publisher and amateur astronomer, and a long-time admirer of See, a fellow Missourian. The book, which many regarded to have been written by See himself, essentially destroyed any remaining credibility he had in the astronomical community. The Nation published a review of the book poking fun at its extraordinary hyperbole, which included such material as: "The infant See, we are told, first saw the light on the 393rd anniversary of Copernicus's birth, ...[and] showed himself 'every inch a natural philosopher' by speculating on the origins of the sun, moon and stars at the age of two, never so much as dreaming that he should grow into a little boy with 'methodical methods', and one day become 'the greatest astronomer in the world'."

See is notorious as the primary modern proponent of the idea that various ancient observers report the color of the bright star Sirius to be red as a result of stellar evolution. The Red-Sirius controversy arises because modern observations show that Sirius is white in color, and the very strong realization from modern astronomers that a reddish color for Sirius in antiquity is essentially impossible by any mechanism of astrophysics.  See published six papers from 1892 to 1926 on the topic, making shrill attacks on critics, and ignoring the substantial numbers of texts from antiquity that described Sirius as blue or white in color. See's obsession with what is now considered as a fringe area (whose solution involves only cultural allusions) only served to further distance the maverick from mainstream astronomy.

See spent the years at Mare Island pursuing fame as a discoverer of the laws of nature, issuing a series of publications on the origin of the solar system, the size of the Milky Way and the cause of sunspots and earthquakes. He also wrote a series of articles about the Aether, which eventually totalled nearly 300 pages, and served as the framework for his theory of everything, in which all forces were transmitted as aetheric waves.

He also engaged in vitriolic attacks against Einstein and his theory of relativity, which Einstein essentially ignored. The scientific community also ignored See's criticisms of relativity.

See's numerous papers are in the collection of the Library of Congress.

Selected writings 
 
 
 See, T. J. J. 1896, "Researches on the evolution of the stellar systems: v. 1. On the universality of the law of gravitation and on the orbits and general characteristics of binary stars." T.P. Nichols (Lynn, Mass.)
 See, T. J. J. 1910, "Researches on the evolution of the stellar systems: v. 2. The capture theory of cosmical evolution, founded on dynamical principles and illustrated by phenomena observed in the spiral nebulae, the planetary system, the double and multiple stars and clusters and the star-clouds of the Milky Way." T.P. Nichols (Lynn, Mass.)
 See, T. J. J. 1920, Astronomische Nachrichten, 211, 49: "New Theory of the Aether"
 See, T. J. J. 1917, Electrodynamic Wave-Theory of Physical Forces, vol. I
 See, T. J. J. 1922, Electrodynamic Wave-Theory of Physical Forces, vol. II
 See, T. J. J. 1925, Naval Observatory, Researches in Non-Euclidian Geometry and the Theory of Relativity: A Systematic Study of Twenty Fallacies in the Geometry of Riemann, Including the So-called Curvature of Space and Radius of World Curvature, and of Eighty Errors in the Physical Theories of Einstein and Eddington, Showing the Complete Collapse of the Theory of Relativity

References

Further reading 
 
 
 
 Webb, William Larkin, 1913 "Brief Biography and Popular Account of the Unparalleled Discoveries of T. J. J. See" T.P. Nichols & Son (Lynn, Mass.)
 "Professor See", review of Brief Biography and Popular Account of the Unparalleled Discoveries of T.J.J. See, The Nation, xcviii, 1914, pp 307–308
 "Capt. T. J. J. See, Astronomer, 96: Co-Founder of Observatory Dies – Disputed Einstein" The New York Times, July 5, 1962, p 22
 Obituary, Physics Today, volume 15(8), (August 1962) page 80
 "The Sage of Mare Island" from The Astronomical Scrapbook, Joseph Ashbrook, 1984, Cambridge University Press, pp. 111–115. (See also Sky & Telescope, October 1962, page 193)

External links
 Portrait of Thomas Jefferson Jackson from the Lick Observatory Records Digital Archive, UC Santa Cruz Library's Digital Collections

1866 births
1962 deaths
American astronomers
University of Missouri alumni
Physicists from Missouri
Scientists from Missouri
People from Montgomery City, Missouri
People involved in plagiarism controversies
Relativity critics